The Mérida flowerpiercer (Diglossa gloriosa) is a species of bird in the family Thraupidae. It is endemic to Venezuela.

Its natural habitats are subtropical or tropical moist montane forests and subtropical or tropical high-altitude shrubland.

References

Mérida flowerpiercer
Birds of the Venezuelan Andes
Endemic birds of Venezuela
Mérida flowerpiercer
Mérida flowerpiercer
Mérida flowerpiercer
Taxonomy articles created by Polbot